The Incense Trade Route was an ancient network of major land and sea trading routes linking the Mediterranean world with eastern and southern sources of incense, spices and other luxury goods, stretching from Mediterranean ports across the Levant and Egypt through Northeastern Africa and Arabia to India and beyond. These routes collectively served as channels for the trading of goods such as Arabian frankincense and myrrh; Indian spices, precious stones, pearls, ebony, silk and fine textiles; and from the Horn of Africa, rare woods, feathers, animal skins, Somali frankincense, gold, and slaves. The incense land trade from South Arabia to the Mediterranean flourished between roughly the 3rd century BC and the 2nd century AD.

Early history

The Egyptians had traded in the Red Sea, importing spices, gold and exotic wood from the "Land of Punt" and from Arabia. Indian goods were brought in Arabian and Indian vessels to Aden. Rawlinson identifies the long-debated "ships of Tarshish," as a Tyrian fleet equipped at Ezion-Geber that made several trading voyages to the east bringing back gold, silver, ivory and precious stones. These goods were transshipped at the port of Ophir.

According to one historian:

Land routes
Among the most important trading points of the incense trade route from the Persian Gulf to the Mediterranean Sea was Gerrha in the Persian Gulf, reported by the historian Strabo to have been founded by Babylonian exiles as a Chaldean colony. Gerrha exercised influence over the incense trade routes across Arabia to the Mediterranean and controlled the aromatics trade to Babylon in the 1st century BC. Gerrha was one of the important entry ports for goods shipped from India.

Due to its prominent position in the incense trade, Yemen attracted settlers from the Fertile Crescent. The frankincense and myrrh trees were crucial to the economy of Yemen and were recognized as a source of wealth by its rulers. Recent exploration discovered an ancient trade route through eastern Yemen in the Mahra region.

Assyrian documents indicate that Tiglath-Pileser III advanced through Phoenicia to Gaza. Gaza was eventually sacked and the ruler of Gaza escaped to Egypt but later continued to act as a vassal administrator. The motive behind the attack was to gain control of the South Arabian incense trade which had prospered along the region.

I.E.S. Edwards connects the Syro-Ephraimite War to the desire of the Israelites and the Aramaeans to control the northern end of the Incense Route, which ran up from Southern Arabia and could be tapped by commanding Transjordan. Archaeological inscriptions also speak of booty retrieved from the land of the mu-u-na-a-a, possibly Meunites mentioned in the Old Testament. Some scholars identify this group as the Minaeans of South Arabia, who were involved with the incense trade and occupied the northern trading outposts of the Incense Route.

Aromatics from Dhofar and luxury goods from India brought wealth to the kingdoms of Arabia. The aromatics of Dhofar were shipped out from the natural harbour of Khor Rori towards the western inhospitable South Arabian coast. The caravans carried these products north to Shabwa and from there on to the kingdoms of Qataban, Saba, Ma'in, and Palestine up to Gaza. There is also evidence to support that products from the Dhofar region were traded with the Sumerian-Magan people of Dilmun and Qatar  as the Sumerian people used some of these resins for medicinal purposes. The tolls levied by the owners of wells and other facilities added to the overall cost of these luxury goods.

Greco-Roman bypassing of land routes

The Nabateans built Petra, which stood halfway between the opening to the Gulf of Akaba and the Dead Sea at a point where the Incense Route from Arabia to Damascus was crossed by the overland route from Petra to Gaza. This position gave the Nabateans a hold over the trade along the Incense Route. In order to control the Incense Route from the Nabatean a Greek military expedition was undertaken, without success, by Antigonus Cyclops, one of Alexander of Macedonia's generals. The Nabatean control over trade increased and spread to the West and the North. The replacement of Greece by the Roman empire as the administrator of the Mediterranean basin led to the resumption of direct trade with the east. According to a historian "The South Arabs in protest took to pirate attacks over the Roman ships in the Gulf of Aden. In response, the Romans destroyed Aden and favoured the Western Abyssinian coast of the Red Sea." The monopoly of the Indian and Arab middlemen weakened with the development of monsoon trade by the Greeks through the discovery of the direct route to India (Hippalus), forcing the Parthian and Arabian middlemen to adjust their prices so as to compete on the Roman market with the goods now being bought in by a direct sea route to India. Indian ships sailed to Egypt as the maritime routes of Southern Asia were not under the control of a single power.

According to one historian:

An earlier commentator on the significance of the trade, in terms of the connectivity of civilisations on both sides of the Red Sea from the time of the Queen of Sheba, was the British explorer Theodore Bent; it was Bent who identified the trading site of Moscha Limen in February 1895. Frankincense from Dhofar was collected at Moscha Limen. It was shipped to Qana and taken overland to Shabwa and further North to Najran, Mecca, Medina, Petra and to Gaza on the Mediterranean Sea. It was also shipped to Babylon and Palmyra via the Persian Gulf.

The Roman trade with India kept increasing, and according to Strabo (II.5.12.):

Decline
According to a historian:

At the end of the sixth century Isidore of Seville enumerated the aromatics still being imported into Visigothic Spain. Of aromatic trees (de arboris aromaticis) Isidore listed in his encyclopedia myrrh, pepper,  cinnamon, amomum (cardamom?) and cassia; of aromatic herbs (de herbis aromaticis), nard, saffron, cardamom, will have arrived through the trade routes, others were available in Spain: thyme, aloes, rose, violet, lily, gentian, wormwood, fennel and others.

Following the Roman-Persian Wars the areas under the Roman Byzantine Empire were captured by Khosrow I of the Persian Sassanian Dynasty. The Arabs, led by 'Amr ibn al-'As, crossed into Egypt in late 639 or early 640.

This advance marked the beginning of the Islamic conquest of Egypt and the fall of ports such as Alexandria, used to secure trade with India by the Greco-Roman world since the Ptolemaic dynasty.

Several centuries after the demise of the incense trade, coffee was responsible for bringing back Yemen to international commerce via the Red Sea port of al-Mocha. 

Finally, the Ottoman Turks conquered Constantinople in the 15th century, marking the beginning of Turkish control over the most direct trade routes between Europe and Asia.

Present status
UNESCO's World Heritage Committee meeting on November 27, 2000, in Cairns, Australia attached World Heritage Site status to The Frankincense Trail in Oman. The official citation reads: 

The World Heritage Committee, headed by Themba Wakashe, recorded Incense Route - Desert Cities in the Negev on UNESCO's World Heritage List on July 15, 2005. The official citation reads:

See also
 Indian Ocean trade
 King's Highway (ancient)
 Way of the Patriarchs
 Via Maris
 Pre-Islamic Arab trade

Notes

References

External links
  BBC Frankincense Trail Series
  "Frankincense Trail in Salalah, Oman"
 Wilford, "Ruins in Yemeni Desert Mark Route of Frankincense Trade", The New York Times, Jan. 28, 1997
 Middle East Institute, The Story of Frankincense, Washington

Former trade routes
Nabataea
History of the Arabian Peninsula
Ancient Somalia
Aksumite Empire
Ancient roads and tracks
History of the Red Sea
Historic trails and roads in India
South Arabia
Myrrh
Land of Punt